1477 Bonsdorffia, provisional designation , is a background asteroid from the outer regions of the asteroid belt, approximately 29 kilometers in diameter. It was discovered on 6 February 1938, by astronomer Yrjö Väisälä at the Iso-Heikkilä Observatory in Turku, Finland. The asteroid was named after Finnish astronomer Ilmari Bonsdorff, who founded the Finnish Geodetic Institute.

Orbit and classification 

Bonsdorffia is a non-family asteroid of the main belt's background population. It orbits the Sun in the outer main-belt at a distance of 2.3–4.1 AU once every 5 years and 9 months (2,090 days). Its orbit has an eccentricity of 0.28 and an inclination of 16° with respect to the ecliptic. The body's observation arc begins 11 days prior to its official discovery observation at Turku.

Physical characteristics 

In the Tholen classification, Bonsdorffia is an X-type asteroid with an unusual spectrum (XU).

Rotation period 

In December 2010, a rotational lightcurve of Bonsdorffia was obtained from photometric observations by astronomer Amadeo Aznar at his Puzol Observatory in Spain. Lightcurve analysis gave a rotation period of 7.8 hours with a brightness amplitude of 0.32 magnitude. Another lightcurve by Richard Durkee at the SOS Observatory gave a similar period of 7.5 hours.

Diameter and albedo 

According to the surveys carried out by the Infrared Astronomical Satellite IRAS, the Japanese Akari satellite and the NEOWISE mission of NASA's Wide-field Infrared Survey Explorer, Bonsdorffia measures between 25.85 and 35.87 kilometers in diameter and its surface has an albedo between 0.033 and 0.06.

The Collaborative Asteroid Lightcurve Link adopts the results obtained by IRAS, that is, an albedo of 0.0517 and a diameter of 28.10 kilometers based on an absolute magnitude of 11.59.

Naming 

This minor planet was named after Ilmari Bonsdorff (1879–1950), Finnish astronomer and founder and director of the Finnish Geodetic Institute. The official naming citation was mentioned in The Names of the Minor Planets by Paul Herget in 1955.

Notes

References

External links 
 Asteroid Lightcurve Database (LCDB), query form (info )
 Dictionary of Minor Planet Names, Google books
 Asteroids and comets rotation curves, CdR – Observatoire de Genève, Raoul Behrend
 Discovery Circumstances: Numbered Minor Planets (1)-(5000) – Minor Planet Center
 
 

001477
Discoveries by Yrjö Väisälä
Named minor planets
001477
19380206